The Ingersoll Lectures is a series of lectures presented annually at Harvard University on the subject of immortality.

Endowment
The Ingersoll Lectureship was established by a bequest by Caroline Haskell Ingersoll, who died in 1893, leaving $5000 for the institution of a series of lectures to be read annually in memory of her father, George Goldthwait Ingersoll. The lectures were to take place at Harvard University on the subject of "the immortality of man".
The lectures were initiated by Harvard president Charles W. Eliot in 1896. They are now generally known as The Ingersoll Lectures on Human Immortality.

On May 21, 1979, the Ingersoll Lecture Fund was transferred to the endowment of Harvard Divinity School, which continues to organize and host the lectures.

The lectures were to be published. From 1896 to 1912 they were issued by the Houghton Mifflin Company of Boston and New York. From 1914 to 1935 Harvard University Press published them. Since then, the lectures have been published primarily in the Harvard Divinity Bulletin or the Harvard Theological Review.

Lecturers and subjects (incomplete)
The chosen lecturers were as follows 

1896: George A. Gordon — Immortality and the New Theodicy
1897: William James — Human Immortality: Two Supposed Objections to the Doctrine
1898: Benjamin Ide Wheeler — Dionysos and Immortality
1899: Josiah Royce — The Conception of Immortality
1900: John Fiske — Life Everlasting
1904: William Osler — Science and Immortality
1905: Samuel McChord Crothers — The Endless Life
1906: Charles Fletcher Dole — The Hope of Immortality: Our Reasons for it
1906B:  Wilhelm Ostwald — Individuality and Immortality
1908: William Sturgis Bigelow — Buddhism and Immortality
1909: G. Lowes Dickinson — Is Immortality Desirable?
1911: George Andrew Reisner — The Egyptian Conception of Immortality 
1914: George Foot Moore — Metempsychosis
1918: Clifford Herschel Moore — Pagan Ideas of Immortality during the Early Roman Empire
1920: Charles Reynolds Brown — Living Again
1921: William Wallace Fenn — Immortality and Theism
1922: Kirsopp Lake — Immortality and the Modern Mind
1923: George Edwin Horr — The Christian Faith and Eternal Life
1924: Philip Cabot — The Sense of Immortality
1925: Edgar S. Brightman — Immortality in Post-Kantian Idealism
1926: Gustav Kruger — The Immortality of Man According to the Views of the Men of the Enlightenment
1927: Harry Emerson Fosdick — Spiritual Values and Eternal Life
1928: Eugene William Lyman — The Meaning of Selfhood and Faith in Immortality
1929: W. Douglas Mackenzie — Man's Consciousness of Immortality
1930: Robert A. Falconer — The Idea of Immortality and Western Civilization
1931: Julius Seelye Bixler — Immortality and the Present Mood
1932: William Pepperell Montague — The Chances of Surviving Death
1933: Shailer Mathews — Immortality and the Cosmic Process
1934: Walter Eugene Clark — Indian Conceptions of Immortality
1935: C. H. Dodd — The Communion of Saints
1936: William Ernest Hocking — Meanings of Death
1937: George Lyman Kittredge — The Old Teutonic Idea of the Future Life
1938: Michael Ivanovich Rostovtzeff — The Mentality of the Hellenistic World and the Afterlife
1940: James Bissett Pratt — The Implications of Selfhood
1941: Alfred North Whitehead — Immortality
1942: Douglas V. Steere — Death's Illumination of Life
1943: Rufus M. Jones — The Spell of Immortality
1944: Louis Finkelstein — The Jewish Doctrine of Human Immortality
1945: Hu Shih — The Concept of Immortality in Chinese Thought
1946: John Haynes Holmes — The Affirmation of Immortality
1947: Howard Thurman — The Negro Spiritual Speaks of Life and Death
1948: Clyde K. M. Kluckhohn — Conceptions of Death Among Southwestern Indians
1949: Edwin Ewart Aubrey — Immortality and Purpose
1950: Charles Harold Dodd — Eternal Life
1951: Georges Florovsky — The Resurrection of Life
1952: Vilhjalmur Stefansson — The Mackenzie River Coronation Gulf Eskimos: Their Concept of the Spirit World and of Immortality
1953: Willard L. Sperry — Approaches to the Idea of Immortality
1954: Theodore Otto Wedel — The Community of Faith as the Agent of Salvation
1955: Oscar Cullmann — Immortality of the Soul and Resurrection of the Dead: The Witness of the New Testament
1956: Harry A. Wolfson — Immortality and Resurrection in the Philosophy of the Church Fathers
1957: Hans Hoffman — Immortality of Life
1958: Werner Jaeger — The Greek Ideas of Immortality
1959: Henry J. Cadbury — Intimations of Immortality in the Thought of Jesus
1960: John Knox — The Hope of Glory
1961: Hans Jonas — Immortality and the Modern Temper
1962: Paul Tillich — Symbols of Eternal Life
1963: Jaroslav Pelikan — Immortal Man and Mortal God
1964: Amos Niven Wilder — Mortality and Contemporary Literature
1965: Eric Voegelin — Immortality: Experience and Symbol
1966: Wilfred Cantwell Smith — Eternal Life
1967: Jürgen Moltmann — Resurrection as Hope
1968: Walter N. Pahnke — The Psychedelic Mystical Experience in the Human Encounter with Death
1970: Elisabeth Kübler-Ross — On Death and Dying
1971: Liston O. Mills — ?
1977: Jane I. Smith — Reflections on Aspects of Immortality in Islam
1981: Victor Turner — Images of Anti-Temporality: An Essay in the Anthropology of Experience
1983: Wolfhart Pannenberg — Constructive and Critical Functions of Christian Eschatology
1984: Martin E. Marty — Hell Disappeared. No One Noticed. A Civic Argument
1985: Robert J. Lifton — The Future of Immortality
1987: John B. Cobb Jr. — The Resurrection of the Soul
1988: Wilfred Cantwell Smith — Transcendence
1989: Caroline Walker Bynum — Bodily Miracles and the Resurrection of the Body in the High Middle Ages
1990: Stephen J. Gould — (title unavailable, but see  for summary)
1991: Lawrence Sullivan — Death at Harvard and Death in America
1993: Marian Wright Edelman — Leave No Child Behind
1994: Jonathan Mann — Health, Society and Human Rights
1995: Steven Katz — The Shoah and Historical Memory
2000: Carol Zaleski — In Defense of Immortality
2001: Huston Smith — Intimations of Immortality: Three Case Studies
2002: Daniel Callahan — The Desire for Eternal Life: Scientific versus Religious Visions
2005: Karen Armstrong —  Is Immortality Important? Religion is about Inhabiting the Eternal Here and Now
2006: James Hal Cone —  Strange Fruit: The Cross and the Lynching Tree
2008: Leora Batnitzky — From Resurrection to Immortality: Theological and Political Implications in Modern Jewish Thought
2009: François Bovon —  The Soul’s Comeback: Immortality and Resurrection in Early Christianity
2010: Albert Raboteau —  Memory Eternal: The Presence of the Dead in Orthodox Christian Piety
2011: Robert R. Desjarlais – Cessation and Continuity: Poiesis in Life and Death among Nepal's Yolmo Buddhists.
2012: Toni Morrison — Goodness: Altruism and the Literary Imagination
2014: Russell Banks — Feeding Moloch: The Sacrifice of Children on the Alter of Capitalism
2017: Marilynne Robinson — Old Souls, New World
2018: Terry Tempest Williams — The Liturgy of Home
 2019: The lectures were paused due to the COVID pandemic.

References

Harvard Divinity School Library website for the Ingersoll Lectures

Series of books
Lecture series
Lectures on religion and science
Harvard University